Prime Cuts is a 2008 album by Tempest. It is a compilation album including both previous releases and new songs. It is released by Magna Carta. It features a CD and a DVD.

Tracks
 "Byker Hill" - 3:10
 "Captain Morgan" – 4:40
 "Cabar Feidh" – 3:11
 "One for the Fiddler" – 3:30
 "Wicked Spring" – 3:50
 "Green Grow the Rashes" – 4:37
 "Lady Howard’s Walk" – 3:42
 "The Serb" (intro) – 1:55
 "The Serb (Keep On Moving)" – 4:09
 "Catalina Island" – 4:07
 "Whoever You Are" – 4:09
 "Queen of Argyll" – 4:18
 "Dance of the Sandwitches" – 4:19
 "The Barrow Man" – 4:52
 "The Karfluki Set" – 7:02
 "You Jacobites By Name" – 4:13
 "Catalina Remix" – 4:34
 "Locomotive Breath" – 4:32

References

Tempest (band) albums
2008 compilation albums